Knut Hjalmar Leonard Hammarskjöld (4 February 1862 – 12 October 1953) was a Swedish politician, scholar, cabinet minister, Member of Parliament from 1923 to 1938 (first chamber), and Prime Minister of Sweden from 1914 to 1917.

In 1890, he married Agnes Maria Carolina Almquist (15 January 1866–21 January 1940). The couple had four sons: Bo, Åke, Sten and Dag.

Life and work
The son of Knut Vilhelm Hammarskjöld, a noble, lieutenant and landowner (descendant in female line of a bastard daughter of Eric XIV of Sweden), and wife Maria Lovisa Cecilia Vilhelmina Cöster, Hjalmar Hammarskjöld was born into the Hammarskjöld family in Tuna, Vimmerby, Kalmar County. He was a versatile legal expert and prominent as both a scholar and as a legislator. In 1891 he became a professor in Uppsala University and had a great influence on Swedish and Nordic civil law. He laid the foundation for his reputation as a great expert in international law at the same time through diligent work in international meetings, and became a member of the Permanent Court of Arbitration in 1904 at The Hague. He was an influential participant at the Second Hague Peace Conference in 1907.

As minister of justice from 1901 to 1902 in Fredrik von Otter's government he made an ambitious but unsuccessful attempt to resolve the problems concerning the right to vote, and was, on his resignation, appointed president of the Göta court of appeal. In connection with the dissolution of the union between Sweden and Norway, he was minister of education and ecclesiastical affairs in Christian Lundeberg's coalition government and negotiator in Karlstad. In 1905 he was appointed to be the Swedish ambassador to Copenhagen. He returned in 1907 to Uppsala as county governor of Uppsala, but often took leave of absence for various other assignments.

After the peasant armament support march and the resignation of the liberal government, he became head of a non-parliamentarian government in 1914, tasked with solving defense issues. His "courtyard government" was politically independent, but loyal to the king and rather conservative. It was created on an initiative from Arvid Lindman, the leader of the right-wing party in the second chamber, who did not want the king to appoint a cabinet under the leader of the right-wing party in the first chamber, Ernst Trygger.

After the outbreak of the First World War that same year, a truce was established between the parties and the defense problem was solved to the satisfaction of the military. Hammarskjöld was principled and inflexible in his interpretations of civil law during the height of the war. It was during this time that the term 'Hunger shield' was coined, because his intractability impeded efforts to get necessary food exports into Sweden. He was seen as too friendly towards Germany when he rejected the proposal for a common trade agreement with Great Britain that Marcus Wallenberg, brother of the foreign minister Knut Wallenberg, had brought home from London in 1917. The split between the PM and the Foreign Minister became apparent and the leaders of the right-wing in the parliament revoked their support for the prime minister, who was forced to submit his resignation.

Hammarskjöld had a dominant nature and was perceived by his opponents as authoritarian and strong-willed, but claims that he favoured Germany lack documented support. He had many prestigious assignments, for example chairman of the Nobel Foundation 1929–1947 and member of parliament (independent conservative). He was voted into the Swedish Academy in 1918 to the same chair as Prime Minister Louis De Geer had occupied, number 17. Hammarskjöld's son, Dag, inherited the chair, as well as the position, after his death. Hammarskjöld's investigations were a major contributing factor to the decision to establish the Supreme Administrative Court of Sweden.

Hjalmar Hammarskjöld died on 12 October 1953 in Stockholm, just over six months after his youngest son became the second Secretary General of the United Nations.

Literature
T. Gihl, The history of Swedish foreign policy 4 (1951)
D. Hammarskjöld, Hjalmar Hammarskjöld: entry speech in the Swedish Academy (1954)
W. Carlgren, The minister Hammarskjöld (1967)
S.A. Söderpalm, The big company owners and the democratic breakthrough (1969)

References

External links
 

1862 births
1953 deaths
People from Vimmerby Municipality
Members of the Riksdag
Members of the Swedish Academy
Swedish nobility
Swedish Lutherans
Prime Ministers of Sweden
Uppsala University alumni
Members of the Permanent Court of Arbitration
Governors of Uppsala County
Burials at Uppsala old cemetery
20th-century Swedish judges
Swedish judges of international courts and tribunals
Swedish people of Belgian descent
Members of the Royal Society of Sciences in Uppsala
Hjalmar
Swedish Ministers of Education and Ecclesiastical Affairs